Modern Sounds in Country and Western Music Volume Two is a 1962 album by Ray Charles. It is the second volume of country and western recordings by Charles following his landmark debut on ABC Records. Following the surprising success of Modern Sounds in Country and Western Music, an album of country music covers, which sold over a million copies, Charles and producer Sid Feller decided to do a follow-up. Unlike the previous album, where slow and fast tracks more or less alternated, this one features one side performed by the Ray Charles Big Band with the Raelettes, while the other side features a string section and the Jack Halloran Singers.

The album has been reissued on CD, coupled with Volume 1, and is also featured on The Complete Country & Western Recordings: 1959-1986 Box Set which also features the first C & W volume and many of Charles' later country recordings.

Critical reception 

In The Rolling Stone Album Guide (1992), J. D. Considine regarded the second Modern Sounds album as superior to the first, "because its balladry is smoother (as with his version of Williams's 'Your Cheatin' Heart') and because the blues tunes rock harder (check his smouldering rendition of Gibson's 'Don't Tell Me Your Troubles')." AllMusic's Richard S. Ginell said it "defied the curse of the sequel and was just as much of an artistic triumph as its predecessor, if not as immediately startling". Robert Christgau, on the other hand, preferred the first volume, writing in Rolling Stone that the second was a "half a step down".

Track listing

Singles

References

External links
Album overview at ArtistDirect
[ Complete C & W Recordings review at AMG]

1962 albums
Ray Charles albums
Albums arranged by Gerald Wilson
Albums arranged by Marty Paich
Albums conducted by Gerald Wilson
Albums conducted by Marty Paich
Albums produced by Sid Feller
ABC Records albums
Country albums by American artists